The  Oklahoma City Yard Dawgz season was the sixth season for the franchise in the af2. The team was coached by Sparky McEwen and played their home games at the Cox Convention Center. The Yard Dawgz finished the regular season 7–9 and made the playoffs for the fifth time in franchise history.

Standings

Schedule

Regular season

Playoffs

Roster

References

Oklahoma City Yard Dawgz seasons
2009 in American football
Oklahoma City Yard Dawgz